Mark Anthony Welsh III (born January 26, 1953) is Dean of the Bush School of Government and Public Service at Texas A&M University and a retired United States Air Force four-star general.  Prior to his current role, he served as Chief of Staff of the United States Air Force and a member of the Joint Chiefs of Staff.  He was appointed by President Barack Obama and confirmed by the United States Senate.  Prior to that, General Welsh served as Commander of U.S. Air Forces in Europe, as the Associate Director for Military Affairs of the Central Intelligence Agency, and as the Vice Commander of Air Education and Training Command.  In earlier portions of his career, he served as a fighter pilot (primarily flying the F-16 and A-10 aircraft) and was a commander at the squadron, group and wing level, in addition to assignments in training, operations, intelligence and acquisitions.  He also served as the Commandant of the United States Air Force Academy.  He was born in San Antonio, Texas, and entered the Air Force in June 1976 as a graduate of the Air Force Academy.

Military career
Welsh's military career culminated in achieving the rank of general (four stars) and serving as the Chief of Staff of the United States Air Force and a member of the Joint Chiefs of Staff.  He was appointed by President Barack Obama in May 2012, testified before the Senate Armed Services Committee in July 2012 and was confirmed shortly thereafter by the United States Senate.  Welsh completed the customary four-year term for a "service chief," retiring in July 2016 after more than 40 years of military service.

During his tenure as a service chief, Welsh "wore two hats" as is customary for the role.  As the chief of a military service, he was the senior-ranking uniformed officer within the service, responsible for the organizing, training and equipping of over 600,000 Air Force personnel, as well as related budgeting and planning functions, liaison with other services and agencies, and interaction with legislators and policymakers.  Separately, as a member of the Joint Chiefs of Staff, he offered advice to the President, the Secretary of Defense, and the National Security Council.

Prior to his final assignment in Washington, Welsh served as the 34th Commander, U.S. Air Forces in Europe and Commander, Allied Air Command Ramstein, Germany, and Director, Joint Air Power Competence Center at Kalkar, Germany. He was responsible for Air Force activities, conducted through 3rd Air Force, in an area of operations covering almost one-fifth of the globe. This area includes 51 countries in Europe, Asia and the Middle East, and the Arctic and Atlantic oceans with a total population reaching nearly one billion people speaking more than 80 languages. He also had administrative control of 17th Air Force, providing support, logistics and resources to U.S. Africa Command.

Welsh previously served as Associate Director of the Central Intelligence Agency (CIA) for Military Support and Associate Director for Military Affairs, Central Intelligence Agency, Washington, D.C. As the ADMA, he served as the principal advisor to the Director of the CIA on military matters and was the primary bridge between the CIA and the Department of Defense for the coordination and planning of military and interagency operations. Additionally, he assisted in the formulation of CIA policies regarding military affairs, managed the provision of direct support to deployed forces, and oversaw the Director of CIA representation at the combatant commands and senior service schools.

Prior to his role at the CIA, Welsh served as the Vice Commander of Air Education and Training Command, a major command of the Air Force responsible for the provision of training and professional education throughout the organization, comprising over 60,000 educators, researchers and related personnel across 12 major installations (schools).

In earlier portions of his military career, Welsh was rated as a command pilot with extensive flying experience in fighter aircraft including the F-16 and the A-10.  As an active fighter pilot, he was selected for command positions at the squadron, group and wing level, before progressing into more senior leadership roles.

Civilian career 

Following his retirement from the military in 2016, Welsh was named Dean of the Bush School of Government and Public Service at Texas A&M University in College Station, Texas. Although Welsh's alma mater is the United States Air Force Academy and he did not attend Texas A&M, he has a decades-long affinity for the university due to his father, children and various other family members attending the university.

On December 8, 2016, Northrop Grumman Corporation announced that it elected Welsh to its board of directors.

Awards and decorations

In 2016, Welsh was named an honorary Tuskegee Airman. Also in 2016, on April 22, Welsh was inducted into the Order of the Sword, the highest honor bestowed on an officer by the Air Force enlisted corps.

Effective dates of promotion
 United States Air Force Academy Cadet – Class of 1976

See also
Chief of Staff of the United States Air Force
List of commanders of USAFE

References
http://www.airn.nato.int/

External links

 

|-

|-

1953 births
Harvard Kennedy School alumni
Living people
Recipients of the Air Force Distinguished Service Medal
Recipients of the Air Medal
Recipients of the Defense Distinguished Service Medal
Recipients of the Defense Superior Service Medal
Recipients of the Distinguished Flying Cross (United States)
Recipients of the Legion of Merit
United States Air Force Academy alumni
United States Air Force generals
Chiefs of Staff of the United States Air Force
Webster University alumni
Wentworth Military Academy and College alumni
Texas A&M University faculty